Jam, Iran is a city in Bushehr Province, Iran.

Jam in Iran, may also refer to:
Jam, Khuzestan
Jam, Semnan
Jam County, in Bushehr County
Jam Rural District, in Bushehr County